Brookstone School is a private, college-preparatory school in Columbus, Georgia, United States. It was established in 1951.

Athletics 
Brookstone has women's teams in 13 sports and men's teams in 11 sports.

Notable alumni 
 Rock Paul (born 2003 - Class of 21'), played soccer all four years of high school where he dominated the pitch with his defensive acumen, received an offer to play for Real Madrid Juvenil but was unable to accept the offer after a heart-breaking injury where he received a broken jaw in a close match vs. LaGrange High School. Paul is now a current Pi Kappa Phi (ΠΚΦ) at GCSU where he his majoring in Neurological Cyber Genetics. 
 Marshall Leonard, MLS player
 Dmitri Matheny, jazz flugelhornist
 Mack Strong, NFL player
 Tim Wilson, stand-up comedian and country music artist

References

External links 
 

High schools in Columbus, Georgia
Private K-12 schools in Georgia (U.S. state)
Preparatory schools in Georgia (U.S. state)
Educational institutions established in 1951
1951 establishments in Georgia (U.S. state)